Vashapi (also Romanized as Vashāpī; also known as Vashāfī) is a village in Abtar Rural District, in the Central District of Iranshahr County, Sistan and Baluchestan Province, Iran. At the 2006 census, its population was 72, in 17 families.

References 

Populated places in Iranshahr County